SVA is an initialism that may refer to:

Military
 South Vietnamese army, unofficial colloquial name for the Army of the Republic of Vietnam (ARVN)
 Student Veterans of America, an education non-profit organization that serves student veterans
 Scottish Veterans Association

Science
 Special visceral afferent, afferent nerves that develop in association with the gastrointestinal tract
 SequenceVariantAnalyzer, a computer program for annotating and analyzing genetic variants
 SINE-VNTR-Alu, a composite, hominid-specific retrotransposon
 SVA, the Specific Area Message Encoding (SAME) code for a Severe thunderstorm watch

Schools
 Sandia View Academy, in Corrales, New Mexico, USA
 School of Visual Arts, in Manhattan, New York City, USA
 Shenandoah Valley Academy, in New Market, Virginia, USA

Sport
Scottish Volleyball Association, the national governing body for volleyball in Scotland

General
 Student Volunteer Army, a volunteer organisation based at the University of Canterbury, New Zealand.
 ICAO designator for Saudi Arabian Airlines, a Saudi airline
 SVA, the IATA code for Savoonga Airport
 Servicio de Vigilancia Aduanera (Customs Surveillance Service), a Spanish law enforcement agency
 Shareholder value added, a financial concept for the estimation of shareholder value
 Single vehicle approval, performed by the Vehicle Certification Agency (VCA) to render a vehicle "street-legal" in the United Kingdom
 Società Valdostana Automobili, a defunct Italian racing car manufacturer
 National Veterinary Institute (Sweden) (Statens veterinärmedicinska anstalt)
 Subject-verb agreement (in grammar)
 Svan language, ISO 639-3 code "sva"
 SystemVerilog assertions